Abdulaziz Al-Nashi (born 7 August 1986) is a Saudi Arabian footballer who currently plays for Al-Qadsiah as a midfielder.

Career
On 8 August 2022, Al-Nashi joined First Division side Al-Qadsiah.

Honours
Al-Hazem
MS League: 2020–21

External links

References

1986 births
Living people
Saudi Arabian footballers
Al-Nahda Club (Saudi Arabia) players
Al Omran Club players
Ettifaq FC players
Al-Nojoom FC players
Al Oyoon FC players
Khaleej FC players
Al-Hazem F.C. players
Al-Sahel SC (Saudi Arabia) players
Al-Qadsiah FC players
Saudi First Division League players
Saudi Professional League players
Saudi Second Division players
Saudi Fourth Division players
Association football midfielders